Banu Amr bin Auf are an Arabian tribe in Quba, on the outskirts of Medina. Umar and his companions stayed with them during the hijra from Mecca.
Its descendants today consist of the Harb tribe.

See also
Arabian tribes that interacted with Muhammad

Tribes of Arabia